Xerocrassa jimenensis is a species of air-breathing land snail, a pulmonate gastropod mollusk in the family Geomitridae.

Distribution

This species is endemic to the provinces of Cádiz, Málaga and Seville in Andalusia, southern Spain.

References

 Puente, A. I. & Arrébola, J. R. (1996). Deux espèces nouvelles Trochoidea (Xerocrassa) du sud de la péninsule Ibérique (Pulmonata, Helicoidae, Hygromiidae). Bulletin du Muséum National d'Histoire Naturelle, Zoologie. 18 (12): 55-67
 Bank, R. A.; Neubert, E. (2017). Checklist of the land and freshwater Gastropoda of Europe. Last update: July 16th, 2017

jimenensis
Molluscs of Europe
Endemic fauna of Spain
Gastropods described in 1996